Nevermind Tribute is a tribute album by Japanese rock artists released on April 4, 2012, to celebrate the 20th anniversary of Nirvana's album Nevermind. The album's release was announced on the official Facebook page regarding the project on February 20, 2012. A one-day live "Nevermind Tribute Live" was held to mark the release of the tribute album.

Track listing

Charts

References

External links
 Official Facebook page

2012 compilation albums
Nirvana (band) tribute albums